The Chairman of the Council of Ministers of the Republic of Crimea is the head of government of the Republic of Crimea (previously the Autonomous Republic of Crimea located in the southern region of Ukraine).

Until 2014, the Prime Minister, whose nomination was proposed by the Speaker of the Verkhovna Rada of Crimea (Crimean parliament) with the approval of the President of Ukraine and then the Crimean parliament, presided over the Council of Ministers of Crimea.

Since 2014, the Prime Minister has been appointed by the Head of the Republic of Crimea, once a candidate for Prime Minister has been approved by the State Council of Crimea (Crimean parliament). The Head of the Republic of Crimea could lead the Council of Ministers of Crimea, but he must also be approved by the State Council.

List

Autonomous Republic of Crimea

Russian annexation of Crimea ("independent Crimea")

Republic of Crimea

Notes

See also
 List of Chairmen of the Executive Committee of Crimea

References

External links
Official website 
World Statesmen.org
Avdeyev, Yu. History of the Crimean Premier Office (История крымского премьерства). Krymskaya Pravda. 1 March 2016

Politics of Crimea